California Redwood Coast – Humboldt County Airport , also known as Arcata–Eureka Airport and Arcata Airport, is in Humboldt County, California, United States,  north of Arcata and  north of Eureka, in McKinleyville.

The National Plan of Integrated Airport Systems for 2011–2015 categorized it as a Nonhub primary commercial service airport.  The airport is a federally designated port of entry for civil aircraft arriving in the United States. The airport is the site of the command center for and primary facilities of the United States Coast Guard Air Station Humboldt Bay, which provides rescue and law enforcement for the region north of the San Francisco Bay Area.

History
The airport was built by the United States Navy during World War II to test defogging systems. It operated in support of the Naval Air Station Alameda as the Arcata Naval Auxiliary Air Station (NAAS) and was headquarters for the Eureka section of naval local defense forces for the 12th Naval District.

In December 1947 a Southwest Airways Douglas DC-3 made the world's first blind landing by a scheduled commercial airliner using Ground-Controlled Approach (GCA) radar, Instrument Landing System (ILS) and Fog Investigation and Dispersal Operation (FIDO) oil-burners next to the runway. By the following year the airline had made 1,200 routine instrument landings at the often fog-shrouded airport.

Facilities

The airport is under the jurisdiction of the California Coastal Commission and major changes to the airport such as rezoning or fencing in the airport require its approval.

The approach path for runway 32 passes over Central Avenue. The glare of the strobe lights that direct planes to the runway were a hazard for drivers, especially during rain when the strobes' intensity increased and the road reflected the blinking lights. Baffles were installed on the strobes which block the lights from shining on the road while still guiding aircraft.

Airlines and destinations

Passenger

Statistics
In the year period ending May 31, 2019 the airport had 42,174 aircraft operations, average 116 per day: 61% military, 25% general aviation, and 14% airline. 24 aircraft at the time were based at the airport: 18 single-engine, 3 multi-engine, and 3 helicopters.

Top destinations

Current airline service

Scheduled flights are currently operated by SkyWest Airlines flying as United Express on a code sharing basis on behalf of United Airlines with three or four nonstop flights per day to SFO on Canadair CRJ-200 and Embraer 175 regional jets as well one nonstop flight per day to LAX. And Denver International Airport.

SkyWest Airlines also currently operates American Eagle service from the airport via a code sharing agreement on behalf of American Airlines with nonstop flights to the American hub in Phoenix (PHX) operated with Canadair CRJ-700 regional jets. The service started June 3, 2021 and ended August 15, 2022.

Daily nonstop service to Denver International Airport (DEN) began on June 7, 2019.

Service has increased significantly since 2015, with five new destinations (LAX, DEN, BUR, PHX, LAS), and passenger departures have increased 56%.

On May 19, 2021, new nonstop scheduled passenger service to Hollywood Burbank Airport (BUR) operated by Avelo Airlines was initiated with Boeing 737-800 mainline jetliners which are currently the largest aircraft type serving the airport. Avelo added service to Harry Reid International Airport aka Las Vegas in November 2021. The Service ended on May 2, 2022.

On November 9, 2021, new nonstop scheduled service to Reno-Tahoe International Airport  (RNO) operated by Aha! Airlines was initiated with Embrear 145s. Aha! ended service to Reno on March 30, 2022.

In August 2022, Alaska Airlines announced a possible reintroduction of service to Seattle Tacoma International Airport or Portland International Airport. On October 20, 2022, the airline cited a potential delay due to the ongoing pilot shortage.

Past airline service

ACV was served by Eureka Aero (mid-1970s) (Eureka, Crescent City), Air Oregon (early 1980s) (San Francisco, Sacramento, Portland, OR, Medford, OR, Eugene, OR, North Bend, OR), American Eagle (San Jose), Pacific Air Lines and predecessor Southwest Airways (San Francisco), Pacific Southwest Airlines (PSA)  (San Francisco), Horizon Air (from 1994 to 2011) (Redding, Portland, Los Angeles and briefly Seattle), Delta Connection (2008–2010) operated by SkyWest Airlines (Salt Lake City), Hughes Airwest and predecessor Air West (Crescent City, Medford, San Francisco, Eugene, Los Angeles, Portland and Seattle); Republic Airlines (1979–1986) (San Francisco and other destinations); United Airlines (San Francisco), WestAir operating as United Express (San Francisco), and Arcata Flying Service (early 1980s) (Redding, Portland, and Oakland). In 2016 and part of 2017, PenAir offered service to Portland International (PDX) and Redding (RDD) with 30 passenger Saab 340Bs. 
American Airlines started flights to Phoenix Sky Harbor International Airport on June 3, 2021, but ended them on August 15th, 2022.
Aha Airlines also started flights to Reno-Tahoe International Airport on November 11, 2021 but ended on March 30th, 2022.

Past jet service

 Pacific Air Lines flew Boeing 727-100s nonstop to San Francisco and direct to Burbank.
 Pacific Southwest Airlines (PSA) flew BAe 146-200s nonstop to San Francisco and direct to Los Angeles.
 WestAir (operating code sharing service as United Express on behalf of United Airlines) flew BAe 146-200s nonstop to San Francisco.
 United Airlines flew Boeing 737-200s to San Francisco.
 SkyWest (operating code sharing service as the Delta Connection on behalf of Delta Air Lines) flew Canadair CRJ-200s to Salt Lake City.
 Hughes Airwest (previously Air West) flew Douglas DC-9-10s and McDonnell Douglas DC-9-30s nonstop to San Francisco and direct to Los Angeles, Phoenix, Tucson, Portland, OR and Seattle. At one point, Hughes Airwest DC-9s flew direct, no change of plane DC-9 service to Mazatlan and Guadalajara via San Francisco, Los Angeles and Tucson.  Predecessor Air West operated Boeing 727-100s, Douglas DC-9-10s and McDonnell Douglas DC-9-30s nonstop to San Francisco.
 Republic Airlines, which was the successor to Hughes Airwest, operated McDonnell Douglas DC-9-30s nonstop to San Francisco with direct, no change of plane DC-9 service to Los Angeles, Las Vegas, Phoenix, Tucson, Memphis and Tampa during the early 1980s.

The first jets scheduled to ACV were Pacific Air Lines Boeing 727-100s in 1967; Pacific also served ACV with Fairchild F-27 turboprops.

Ground transportation
  The U.S. 101 freeway is accessible to the airport via the Arcata Airport exit.
 Amtrak Thruway Motorcoach: Dedicated Express Service to Martinez connecting with Amtrak California's San Joaquin and Capitol Corridor trains.
 Redwood Transit System
 Door-to-door airport shuttle Service, taxis, and rental cars can be arranged at the airport.

Other local airports
 Eureka Municipal Airport
 Kneeland Airport
 Murray Field
 Rohnerville Airport

References

External links
 Fly Humboldt!
 Humboldt County: Aviation
 Airport webcam
 Aerial image as of April 1989 from USGS The National Map
 

Airports in Humboldt County, California
Eureka, California
1940s establishments in California
Airports established in the 1940s
Closed installations of the United States Navy